The 1966 Hofstra Flying Dutchmen football team was an American football team that represented Hofstra University during the 1966 NCAA College Division football season. Hofstra finished second-to-last in the Middle Atlantic Conference, University Division.

In their 17th year under head coach Howard "Howdy" Myers Jr., the Flying Dutchmen compiled a 2–8 record, and were outscored 175 to 133. Mike D'Amato and Frank Marcinowski were the team captains. Hofstra's 1–3 record against MAC University Division opponents earned sixth place in the seven-team division.

The Flying Dutchmen played their home games at Hofstra Stadium on the university's Hempstead campus on Long Island, New York.

Schedule

References

Hofstra
Hofstra Pride football seasons
Hofstra Flying Dutchmen football